Scott G. Stewart is the solicitor general for the state of Mississippi. He is widely known for arguing and winning in the landmark case Dobbs v. Jackson Women's Health Organization before the U.S. Supreme Court. Prior to that, he clerked for Justice Clarence Thomas and worked for the Department of Justice under Donald Trump where he took aggressive anti-abortion stances.

References

Living people
Mississippi lawyers
Year of birth missing (living people)
Princeton University alumni
Stanford Law School alumni